is a Japanese skier and alpinist.

Early life
Born in  Aomori City on October 12, 1932, his father, Keizo Miura, was a Japanese skier. Yūichirō was exposed to snow sports from the time he was a child, and placed in his first skiing competition during his second grade year in elementary school. He moved south with his family but found that he missed the snow and winter sports, prompting him to enroll at Hokkaido University. There, he continued to pursue skiing as a professional sport.

Career 
He competed in speedskiing and downhill skiing.  His advanced ability to ski, especially in the back-country, required him to reach higher elevations by hiking, expanding the breadth of his skills to include mountain climbing. Once he became a prolific mountain climber, Miura began challenging larger mountains and skied down many of them. While active in ski competitions, he competed for the average speed in the 100 meter section of the steep slope downhill. The world's highest record was established in Italy in July 1964 with a speed of 172.084 km/h.

Miura became the first person to ski on Mount Everest on May 6, 1970. He descended nearly 4,200 vertical feet from the South Col (elevation over 8,000 m (26,000 ft)). This feat was documented in 1975, in the film The Man Who Skied Down Everest. The film won the Academy Award for best documentary, the first sports film to do so. He also succeeded in skiing downhill at seven of the highest peaks in Europe from 1978 to 1985.

In 2003 at the age of 70, Miura became the oldest person to reach the summit of Mount Everest. This record was later broken by himself. Miura had two heart surgeries for cardiac arrhythmia, in 2006 and 2007. On May 23, 2013 Miura again became the oldest person to climb to the summit of Mount Everest at the age of 80. This achievement is listed in the Guinness Book of Records. He was unable to complete the descent after reaching the top, and was airlifted from Advanced Base Camp at 6500 meters, not walking down to the Base Camp at 5364 metre (17,600 feet). Famous alpinists, like Ken Noguchi, question Miura's achievement and say that a climb can not be called “complete” unless one walks all the way down the mountain.

Miura describes his diet as "healthy eating and organic food. He starts every day with a breakfast consisting of cooked rice, fermented soya bean, miso soup, eggs, and fish. Once a week he will treat himself to a 500g (18oz) steak." He said that he trained outdoors with 5 kg on each leg and 30 kg on his back for 5.5 mile walks, and also used a low oxygen room. Gota Miura, freestyle skier and alpinist, is one of his sons.

See also
List of Mount Everest records
List of Mount Everest summiters by number of times to the summit

References

External links
 
Team Miura's website (Japanese and English)
 
Team Miura press release of May 26 2008 Summit 
The Telegraph - Meet Yuichiro Miura, the man planning to conquer Everest at 90 

Japanese mountain climbers
Japanese male ski mountaineers
Summiters of the Seven Summits
Japanese summiters of Mount Everest
1932 births
Living people
Academic staff of Aomori University